The Tucker House is located in Martinez, California. Originally located at 40 Escobar Street, this luxurious 4 story, 4 bedroom, 2 bath mansion was built for Captain John Tucker, a former sea captain from Nantucket, Massachusetts, who settled in Martinez, become a wheat farmer and built a mansion atop the hill on Escobar Street in 1877. The persons who moved into the house included not only the Captain, but also his wife, Mary Swain Tucker, Mary's brother, Sylvester Swain, Swain's wife and daughter, and a Chinese servant known only as Vu.  On Halloween, October 31, 1880, Captain Tucker died. The house was moved to 110 Escobar St. in the 1920s by City Postmaster Franklin Glass. After the house had been moved, it had served as a bordello for a while during the 1920s and 30s.

Revealing mysteries
According to a 2010 article in the San Jose Mercury News, a Martinez couple, Joey and Linda Piscitelli, both general contractors who restore houses for a living, decided to buy Tucker House in 2005. When they started cleaning up the old house, they began to discover various mysteries. When they opened the attic, they found that it had been divided into eight separate cubicles, each containing a mattress. This led them to do further research into the history of the house, revealing the secret of its use as a bordello.

The new owners found scores of old medicine bottles, in addition to an 1879 medical almanac. Researching historical records, the Piscitellis learned that the Pacific Medical and Surgical Journal had reported in 1874, that Martinez had experienced an epidemic of Scarlatina (better known today as scarlet fever). Only two of these cases were classed as serious. A young child who contracted the disease had died. The other case was Captain John Tucker, who survived.

Notes

See also
National Register of Historic Places listings in Contra Costa County, California

References

External links 
 The Tucker House
  "A Peek Inside a Haunted Mansion." The Mercury News. October 26, 2010. Updated August 13, 2016.

History of Contra Costa County, California
Historic districts on the National Register of Historic Places in California
National Register of Historic Places in the San Francisco Bay Area
Houses in Contra Costa County, California
Houses on the National Register of Historic Places in California
Landmarks in San Diego
Houses completed in 1877
1877 establishments in California